The Gododdin were a Brittonic people of north-eastern Britannia, the area known as the Hen Ogledd or Old North (modern south-east Scotland and north-east England), in the sub-Roman period.  Descendants of the Votadini, they are best known as the subject of the 6th-century Welsh poem Y Gododdin, which memorialises the Battle of Catraeth and is attributed to Aneirin.

The name Gododdin is the Modern Welsh form, but the name appeared in Old Welsh as Guotodin and derived from the tribal name Votadini recorded in Classical sources, such as in Greek texts from the Roman period.

Kingdom
It is not known exactly how far the kingdom of the Gododdin extended, possibly from the Stirling area to the kingdom of Bryneich (Bernicia), and including what are now the Lothian and Borders regions of eastern Scotland. It was bounded to the west by the Brittonic Kingdom of Strathclyde, and to the north by the Picts. Those living around Clackmannanshire were known as the Manaw Gododdin. Gododdin included districts such as Manaw Gododdin and Eidyn south of the Firth of Forth.

Cunedda, legendary founder of the Kingdom of Gwynedd in north Wales, is supposed to have been a Manaw Gododdin warlord who migrated southwest during the 5th century.

Later history

In the 6th century, Bryneich was invaded by the Angles and became known as Bernicia. The Angles continued to press north. In around 600 the Gododdin raised a force of about 300 men to assault the Angle stronghold of Catraeth, perhaps Catterick, North Yorkshire. The battle, which ended disastrously for the Britons, was memorialised in the poem Y Gododdin.

In 638, Eidyn, modern Edinburgh, was under siege and fell to the Angles, for the Gododdin seem to have come under the rule of Bernicia around this time. To what extent the native population was replaced or assimilated is unknown. Bernicia became part of Northumbria. Shortly afterwards this came under a unified England, then in 1018 Malcolm II brought the region as far as the River Tweed under Scottish rule.

See also
Mynyddawg Mwynfawr

Notes

References 
 Kenneth H. Jackson (1969). The Gododdin: The Oldest Scottish poem (Edinburgh: University Press) * W.J. Watson (1926, 1986). The History of the Celtic Place-Names of Scotland: being the Rhind lectures on archaeology (expanded) delivered in 1916. (Edinburgh, London: W. Blackwood & Sons, 1926; Edinburgh: Birlinn, 1986, reprint edition). 
 W.J. Watson (1926, 1986). The History of the Celtic Place-Names of Scotland: being the Rhind lectures on archaeology (expanded) delivered in 1916. (Edinburgh, London: W. Blackwood & Sons, 1926; Edinburgh: Birlinn, 1986, reprint edition). 
 Davies, John. "Dinas Powys, Catraeth, and Llantwit Major." A History of Wales. London: Allen Lane :, 1993. 61–62. Print.
 Davies, Norman. "The Germanico-Celtic Isles." The Isles: A History. Oxford: Oxford UP, 1999. 165–166, 185–187, 195, 207. Print.

Further reading
 Ian Armit (1998). Scotland's Hidden History (Tempus [in association with Historic Scotland]) 
 Stuart Piggott (1982). Scotland Before History (Edinburgh: University Press)

External links

Former countries in the British Isles
Celtic Britons
Tribes of ancient Scotland
Lothian
Scottish culture
States and territories established in the 5th century
Hen Ogledd
Historical Celtic peoples